Beebyn Station is a pastoral lease that operates as a sheep station in Western Australia. 

In 2015 the lease was owned by Viper Holdings Pty. Ltd.

See also
List of ranches and stations
List of pastoral leases in Western Australia

References

Pastoral leases in Western Australia
Stations (Australian agriculture)
Homesteads in Western Australia
Mid West (Western Australia)